Parmleysville is an unincorporated community in Wayne County, Kentucky, United States. Also known as Horse Hollow, it lies approximately 14 miles southeast of the county seat of Monticello along the banks of the Little South Fork of the Cumberland River.

References

Unincorporated communities in Kentucky
Unincorporated communities in Wayne County, Kentucky